Wolfe Tones is a Gaelic Athletic Association club in Shannon in County Clare, Ireland.

Honours

2010s
 Clare Senior B Football Championship (2): 2010, 2012
 Munster Intermediate Club Hurling Championship (1): 2015 
 Clare Intermediate Hurling Championship (1): 2015
 Clare Intermediate Football Championship (1): 2014
 Clare Junior A Ladies Football Championship (1): 2010
 Clare Junior B Football Championship (1): 2016
 Clare Junior B Hurling Championship (1): 2016
 Clare Junior C Hurling Championship (1): 2015
 Clare Under-21 B Hurling Championship (1): 2010
 Clare Minor C Hurling Championship (2): 2012, 2013
 Clare Under-16 A Football Championship (1): 2010
 Clare Under-16 C Hurling Championship (1): 2010
 Clare Under-14 A Hurling Championship (1): 2011
 Clare Under-14 A Football Championship (1): 2011
 Clare Féile na nGael Championship (1): 2011
 Clare Féile Péil na nÓg Championship (1): 2011

2000s
 Clare Senior Hurling Championship (1): 2006
 Clare Senior B Hurling Championship (1): 2008
 Clare Junior A Hurling Championship (1): 2008
 Clare Junior A Ladies Football Championship (3): 2003, 2004, 2009
 Clare Junior B Football Championship (1): 2000
 Clare Junior C Hurling Championship (1): 2008
 Clare Hurling League Div.1 (Clare Cup) (1): 2006
 Clare Hurling League Div.3 (1): 2003
 Clare Football League Div.3 (1): 2005
 Clare Football League Div.4 (1): 2000
 Clare Ladies Football League Div.3 (1): 2003
 Dunworth's Perpetual Cup: 2008
 Clare Minor A Football Championship (2): 2005, 2006
 Clare Minor A Ladies Football Championship (2): 2003, 2004
 Clare Minor B Hurling Championship (1): 2004
 Clare Under-16 A Football Championship (1): 2004
 Clare Under-16 A Ladies Football Championship (1): 2005
 Clare Under-16 B Hurling Championship (1): 2001 
 Clare Under-16 Football League (1): 2004
 Féile Péil na nÓg All-Ireland Championship (1): 2002
 Clare Under-14 A Football Championship (3): 2001, 2002, 2007
 Clare Under-14 A Ladies Football Championship (1): 2004
 Clare Féile Péil na nÓg Championship (2): 2002, 2008
 Clare Under-12 A Hurling Championship (1): 2000
 Clare Under-12 A Football Championship (2): 2005, 2009
 Clare Under-12 A Ladies Football Championship (2): 2004, 2005
 Clare Under-12 B Hurling Championship (1): 2004
 Clare Under-12 Hurling League (1): 2004
 Clare Community Games Under-12 Ladies Football Championship (1): 2000

1990s
 All-Ireland Senior Club Hurling Championship Runners-Up: 1997
 Munster Senior Club Hurling Championship (1): 1996 
 Clare Senior Hurling Championship (1): 1996
 Clare Intermediate Football Championship (2): 1990, 1996
 Mid-South Clare Intermediate Hurling Championship (1): 1996
 Clare Junior A Hurling Championship (1): 1995
 Clare Under-21 A Hurling Championship (2): 1990, 1991
 Clare Under-21 A Football Championship (1): 1990
 Clare Minor A Hurling Championship (1): 1992
 Clare Under-16 A Hurling Championship (2): 1990, 1998
 Clare Under-15 A Hurling Championship (3): 1990, 1991, 1995
 Clare Under-14 A Hurling Championship (3): 1990, 1994, 1996
 Clare Under-12 A Hurling Championship (3): 1990, 1992, 1994

1980s
 Clare Intermediate Hurling Championship (1): 1983
 Clare Junior B Hurling Championship (1): 1987
 Clare Hurling League Div.4 (1): 1987
 Clare Under-21 A Hurling Championship (1): 1989
 Clare Minor A Football Championship (2): 1985, 1988
 Clare Minor A Hurling Championship (1): 1988
 Clare Minor C Hurling Championship (1): 1984
 Clare Minor Hurling League (1): 1988
 Clare Under-17 A Football Championship (1): 1988
 Clare Under-16 A Hurling Championship (4): 1986, 1987, 1988, 1989
 Clare Under-16 A Football Championship (2): 1983, 1988
 Clare Under-16 Football League (2): 1983, 1988
 Clare Under-15 A Hurling Championship (3): 1987, 1988, 1989
 Féile na nGael All-Ireland Championship (Christy Ring Trophy) (3): 1986, 1987, 1988
 Féile Péil na nÓg All-Ireland Championship (1): 1988
 Clare Féile na nGael Championship (3): 1986, 1987, 1988
 Clare Féile Péil na nÓg Championship (1): 1988
 Clare Under-14 A Hurling Championship (6): 1981, 1982, 1983, 1986, 1988, 1989
 Clare Under-14 A Football Championship (3): 1980, 1981, 1988
 Clare Under-14 B Hurling Championship (2): 1980, 1985
 All Ireland Community Games Under-12 Football Championship (1): 1988
 Clare Under-12 A Football Championship (3): 1984, 1986, 1988
 Clare Under-12 A Hurling Championship (3): 1982, 1984, 1988
 Clare Under-12 C Hurling Championship (2): 1981, 1983

1970s
 Clare Intermediate Football Championship (2): 1973, 1975
 Clare Junior A Hurling Championship (2): 1974, 1979
 Clare Junior A Football Championship (1): 1972
 Clare Hurling League Div.3 (1): 1973
 Clare Under-14 B Hurling Championship (1): 1978
 Clare Under-12 A Football Championship (2): 1977, 1979

1960s
 Clare Junior A Football Championship (1): 1967

Before Wolfe Tones
 Clare Junior A Hurling Championship (2): 1931 (as Tradaree), 1943 (as Tradaree)

History
Wolfe Tones na Sionna was founded in 1967.

Current notable players
Three of the last four Clare senior hurling team captains have been from the club; Brian Lohan, Frank Lohan and 2008 captain Brian O'Connell. Aaron Cunningham is the club's current representative on the Clare senior hurling team. 
Chris Dunning is on the Clare senior football team.
 Aaron Cunningham
 Brian Lohan
 Frank Lohan
 Brian O'Connell

External links 
 Clare GAA site
 Clare GAA club sites
 Clare on Hoganstand.com
 Official Wolfe Tones na Sionna Club website

References 

Hurling clubs in County Clare
Gaelic games clubs in County Clare